Giuseppe Ajmone (1923 – 2005) was a modern Italian painter.

Biography
Ajmone was born in Carpignano Sesia, and moved to Milan to study at the Brera Academy in 1941, under Achille Funi and Carlo Carrà. In 1946, he signed on to a Manifesto del Realismo under the pseudonym of  Oltre Guernica. He participated at an exhibition at the Galleria Bergamini of Milan and received an award at the First National Exhibition of Painting at Bellagio. In 1950, he participated at the 25th International exhibition at the Biennale of Venice. In 1951, he was awarded the Premio Senatore Borletti for young Italian painters.

He often exhibited abroad, including at the Biennale di San Paolo del Brasile in 1951 and 1959; in 1959 to the Biennale Internazionale di Tokyo; in 1955 and 1958, he exhibited at the Pittsburgh International Museum of Art; and as well as at Copenhagen, Dortmund, Nuremberg, and Buenos Aires.

He continued to exhibit until the 2004. He painted both landscapes and semi-abstract figures. In 1945 he founded a journal in Novara titled "Numero", which moved to Milan with the name "Numero - Pittura" (later "Pittura").

References

1923 births
2005 deaths
Brera Academy alumni
20th-century Italian painters
Italian male painters
21st-century Italian painters
People from the Province of Novara
Painters from Milan
Italian landscape painters
20th-century Italian male artists
21st-century Italian male artists
Compasso d'Oro Award recipients